This is a list of algebraic topology topics, by Wikipedia page. See also:
Glossary of algebraic topology
topology glossary
List of topology topics
List of general topology topics
List of geometric topology topics
Publications in topology
 Topological property

Homology (mathematics)

Simplex
Simplicial complex
Polytope
Triangulation
Barycentric subdivision
Simplicial approximation theorem
Abstract simplicial complex
Simplicial set
Simplicial category
Chain (algebraic topology)
Betti number
Euler characteristic
Genus
Riemann–Hurwitz formula
Singular homology
Cellular homology
Relative homology
Mayer–Vietoris sequence
Excision theorem
Universal coefficient theorem
Cohomology
List of cohomology theories
Cocycle class
Cup product
Cohomology ring
De Rham cohomology
Čech cohomology
Alexander–Spanier cohomology
Intersection cohomology
Lusternik–Schnirelmann category
Poincaré duality
Fundamental class
Applications
Jordan curve theorem
Brouwer fixed point theorem
Invariance of domain
Lefschetz fixed-point theorem
Hairy ball theorem
Degree of a continuous mapping 
Borsuk–Ulam theorem
Ham sandwich theorem
Homology sphere

Homotopy theory

Homotopy
Path (topology)
Fundamental group
Homotopy group
Seifert–van Kampen theorem
Pointed space
Winding number
Simply connected
Universal cover
Monodromy
Homotopy lifting property
Mapping cylinder
Mapping cone (topology)
Wedge sum
Smash product
Adjunction space
Cohomotopy
Cohomotopy group
Brown's representability theorem
Eilenberg–MacLane space
Fibre bundle
Möbius strip
Line bundle
Canonical line bundle
Vector bundle
Associated bundle
Fibration
Hopf bundle
Classifying space
Cofibration
Homotopy groups of spheres
Plus construction
Whitehead theorem
Weak equivalence
Hurewicz theorem
H-space

Further developments

Künneth theorem
De Rham cohomology
Obstruction theory
Characteristic class
Chern class
Chern–Simons form
Pontryagin class
Pontryagin number
Stiefel–Whitney class
Poincaré conjecture
Cohomology operation
Steenrod algebra
Bott periodicity theorem
K-theory
Topological K-theory
Adams operation
Algebraic K-theory
Whitehead torsion
Twisted K-theory
Cobordism
Thom space
Suspension functor
Stable homotopy theory
Spectrum (homotopy theory)
Morava K-theory
Hodge conjecture
Weil conjectures
Directed algebraic topology

Applied topology

Example: DE-9IM

Homological algebra

Chain complex
Commutative diagram
Exact sequence
Five lemma
Short five lemma
Snake lemma
Splitting lemma
Extension problem
Spectral sequence
Abelian category
Group cohomology
Sheaf
Sheaf cohomology
Grothendieck topology
Derived category

History 

Combinatorial topology

 
Mathematics-related lists
Outlines of mathematics and logic
Wikipedia outlines